Max Abraham (26 March 1875 – 16 November 1922) was a German physicist known for his work on electromagnetism and his opposition to the theory of relativity.

Biography

Abraham was born in Danzig, Imperial Germany (now Gdańsk in Poland) to a family of Jewish merchants. His father was Moritz Abraham and his mother was Selma Moritzsohn.  Attending the University of Berlin, he studied under Max Planck. He graduated in 1897. For the next three years, Abraham worked as Planck's assistant.

From 1900 to 1909, Abraham worked at Göttingen as a privatdozent, an unpaid lecturing position. Abraham developed his theory of the electron in 1902, in which he hypothesized that the electron was a perfect sphere with a charge divided evenly around its surface. Abraham's model was competing with that developed by Hendrik Lorentz (1899, 1904) and Albert Einstein (1905) which seem to have become more widely accepted; nevertheless, Abraham never gave up his model, since he considered it was based on "common sense". Abraham was a staunch opponent of the theory of relativity.

In 1909 Abraham travelled to the United States to accept a position at the University of Illinois, but ended up returning to Göttingen after a few months. He was later invited to Italy by Tullio Levi-Civita, and found work as the professor of rational mechanics at the Politecnico di Milano university until 1914.

When World War I started, Abraham was forced to return to Germany. During this time he worked on the theory of radio transmission. After the war, he still was not allowed back into Milan, so until 1921 he worked at Stuttgart as the professor of physics at Technische Hochschule.

After his work at Stuttgart, Abraham accepted the position of chair in Aachen; however, before he started his work there he was diagnosed with a brain tumor. He died on 16 November 1922 in Munich, Germany.

After his death, Max Born and Max von Laue wrote about him in an obituary: He loved his absolute aether, his field equations, his rigid electron just as a youth loves his first flame, whose memory no later experience can extinguish.

Publications

References

Further reading

External links
 
 

1875 births
1922 deaths
20th-century German physicists
Deaths from brain cancer in Germany
20th-century German Jews
Humboldt University of Berlin alumni
Jewish physicists
People from the Province of Prussia
Academic staff of the Polytechnic University of Milan
Relativity critics
Scientists from Gdańsk
University of Illinois faculty